Sébastien Vincent (born 4 October 1982) is a French badminton player affiliated with B.C. Chambly Oise. In 2009, he won French National Badminton Championships in men's doubles event with his partner Svetoslav Stoyanov.

Achievements

BWF International Challenge/Series 
Men's doubles

  BWF International Challenge tournament
  BWF International Series tournament
  BWF Future Series tournament

References

External links 
 

1982 births
Living people
French male badminton players